Wang Zigan (Chinese:王子淦) (April 18, 1920 - February 16, 2000) was a modern papercutting artist, master of arts and crafts, and famous Shanghai-style papercutter. His works contain both the delicacy of the South and the outgoingness of the North, ranging from flowers and grass to insects, birds, and beasts. His most important representative works are "The crowing of the cock" (Chinese: 一唱雄鸡天下白), "Chicken eats centipede" (Chinese: 鸡吃蜈蚣), etc. Some of his published works include "Selected papercutting works of Wang Zigan" (Chinese: 王子淦剪纸选), "History of Shanghai papercutting" (Chinese: 上海剪纸今夕) and "The creation of papercutting" (Chinese: 剪纸艺术的创新).

Early life
Wang was born to a poor peasant family in Jinsha Town (Chinese: 金沙镇), Nantong, Jiangsu Province. He came to Shanghai with his uncle at the age of 13 and began to learn the art of papercutting from the street artist Wu Wanheng (Chinese: 武万恒). He was quick to learn the skills, and set up a stand to sell papercut works by the street near the New Town God's Temple (Chinese: 新城隍庙). Baixianqiao (Chinese: 八仙桥) or other downtown areas. Over the years, Wang cut tens of thousands of papercut works or embroidery patterns which were distributed among urban and rural areas. Even so, his family, including six members, experienced hunger and lived in poverty for years. As a papercut artist, his life was poor and his artistic value was never officially recognized. However, Wang hoped that this folk art could be handed down so that he could live on it.

With the care of the Communist Party and the Government after 1949, Wang began to work in Shanghai Arts and Crafts Studio (Chinese: 工艺美术研究室; now Shanghai Arts and Crafts Institution, 上海工艺美术研究所). Seeing the wide difference in the life of the present day from the old times and what life meant to him, he loved the work as well as the new China.

Childhood
Wang Zigan lived in a generation that life had become tough. His parents had to send him away, just after his birth, to his uncle for adoption, because his uncle had not yet had any children after getting married. His uncle was also a poor farmer and in order to make more money to raise Wang Zigan, he began to learn haircutting. When he had learned the skill he borrowed some money and opened a barber shop, thinking that his life might improve later. When Wang Zigan was six, his uncle was invited by Jinsha State School upon recommendation to do haircuts for its teachers and students. In return, Wang Zigan was admitted in the school. It was the only education Wang Zigan ever received. That had a great impact on his later life journey and laid a solid foundation for many other things he had to learn by himself, and also served as literacy necessary for his artistic career.

In 1932, Wang Zigan, as a child under 13, moved into Shanghai with his uncle. After a while, Wang Zigan was accepted by a watchmaker's shop to do odd jobs. But he left there at last because of torture.

His uncle tried to search for a job for Wang Zigan. At that time there was a papercut stand, whose owner was called Wu Wanheng, 26 years old, pretty famous in the papercutting circle and was about to accept an apprentice. Wang Zigan became the lucky one, and thus, he started his 60-year career of papercutting.

Apprentice life
Wu Wanheng chiefly made papercuts of folk embroidery patterns. Wang Zigan was supposed to do house chores, get up early in the morning, light the stove, cook the breakfast, wash vegetables and the rice for lunch, then help his master at the stand, when evening fell, he had to do house chores till late at night. The masters in the old times in fact would not attentively teach their apprentice very much, but Wang Zigan was quick to learn. He made the best of his time to learn the skills.

The way to learn the skills was limited to copying the samples his master had cut. Because Wang Zigan did not put off the work he should do, the master was happy and let him do what he wanted to. During this period Wang Zigan was very hard learning the skills and from time to time handed the papercut works to his master for correction and advice, who sometimes commented a little on his works. By the kind help of his master and his own hard work, Wang Zigan began to take mastery of the basic skills and knowledge of papercut and with the advancement of skills, developed a profound interest in the art of papercut.

There were about 100 papercut artists like Wu Wanheng in Shanghai, most of them living near Baxianqiao. When it rained and putting up a stand outside was impossible, they would gather in the tea house and do papercut works. Wang Zigan often went there with his master looking at his man's art and that man's scope. That was a good opportunity for him to broaden his views and learn skills from others. Wang Zigan had a good memory and managed to keep in mind the new patterns he saw and the skills in them that excelled his.

Wang Zigan completed his apprenticeship three years later. By then, his master had developed his business and established a shop selling papercut patterns named "Heng Chang Xiang" (Chinese: 恒昌祥) at No. 147 Jinling Road (Chinese: 金陵中路147号) Shanghai. Traditionally, the apprentice should leave his master by then, but Wang Zigan's master was reluctant to let him go. On the one hand, there would be a lack of manpower as his business was growing, on the other hand, Wang Zigan was improving his skills, and the most valuable aspect was that Wang Zigan never confined himself to what he had learned from his master but developed new patterns according to market demands, which won applause from the customers and helped to push up the business of "Heng Chang Xiang" far ahead of other shops in the industry. So the master tried his best to keep Wang Zigan, and Wang Zigan, considering that he was alone in Shanghai then (as his uncle and aunt had left for Congmin Island), having no other place to live if he should leave his master, and that he had no extra money to open a business on his own, agreed to stay. There, Wang Zigan had stayed for ten years, during which period he ate and slept with his master with the only exception that he could earn a little money, which barely kept him from cold and hunger.

During that period, Wang Zigan, like many others in Shanghai, experienced the various difficulties in the Anti-Japanese War. Though the political situation was turbulent and his life was hard during those ten years, during that period Wang Zigan made significant development in the art of papercutting through his hard work, such that his skills had in fact excelled that of his master and as a result his master relied more on him than before. Many of the customers came to buy papercuts at "Hong Chang Xiang" by designating it to be done by Wang Zigan. Wang Zigan's art of papercut had been in reality the major economic source for "Hong Chang Xiang" and he became well known as one of the best folk artists of papercutting in Shanghai.

Marriage
In about 1943, Wang Zigan married Pan Miaoxin (Chinese: 潘妙新). Pan Miaoxin was the only daughter in her family, and happened to lease the backroom the "Heng Chang Xiang" when her family fled from Changshu, Jiangsu Province to Shanghai due to the Anti-Japanese War. Wang Zigan. Pan Miaoxin was well-born, calm tempered and pretty. She was well educated by her parents and had received several years of education. Like many girls and young ladies at that time in Shanghai, Pan Miaoxin loved embroidery very much, so she was fascinated at the first sight of the beautiful papercut works made by Wang Zigan, which she had never seen before. Spellbound by Wang Zigan's techniques, she would visited the papercut shop everyday to watch him working and sometimes helped him when he was at the busy time. The two young people then gradually fell in love with each other. Pan Miaoxin's mother held out fiercely against their marriage because she wished her daughter could married to a rich man so that she herself could live a leisurely life based on her daughter's marriage, by the way, this kind of idea was very common in the old times. However, they got married secretly, without her mother's permission.

With the settlement of the marriage dispute, Wang Zigan began to consider doing business by himself, for the income from his master was not enough to feed himself at that moment, let alone his wife and the children they were to have. His master did not agree at first when he told him about the plan, but finally the master agreed with a requirement that put forth some economic terms in respect of compensations for the master. By 1945 when the Anti-Japanese War was ended, Wang Zigan had welcomed his personal victory as well and get rid of the control of his master.

To operate his own business, Wang Zigan leased a stand at the New Town God's Temple (now next to the intersection of Lianyun Road and Jinling Road) selling his own work. Many of his former customers with "Heng Chang Xiang" turned to him for his papercut works because of his good reputation and good interpersonal relations with customers. Thus, Wang Zigan could live a well-off life with his family. As the market was bearish, due to the civil war that broke out following the Anti-Japanese War, Wang Zigan had to work very hard to earn a little profit, and his wife had to do embroidery for other families to help him.

People's Republic of China
After the establishment of the People's Republic of China, everything was looking forward to further development and the government paid enough attention of folk arts and as a result the art of papercutting by Wang Zigan drew attention of the relevant cultural departments. In 1953, the Bureau of Culture of Shanghai Municipal Government recommended some of Wang Zigan's works be exhibited in the East China Arts and Crafts Exhibition (Chinese: 华东地区工艺美术作品观摩会).

Then the government was committed to searching for artists with special skills everywhere and planned to get them organized. The Shanghai Arts and Crafts Studio (Chinese: 工艺美术研究室) (now Shanghai Arts and Crafts Institution, Chinese: 上海工艺美术研究所) was established in 1956, which engaged from the society twelve senior artists with a long artistic career and high professional skills to do professional research work. Wang Zigan, 37 years old at that time, and was the youngest of them.

The beginning of a new life gave Wang Zigan more sparking idea on his works: he used to make merchandise—a piece of art today. Wang Zigan made efforts to cultivate and rearrange the historical tradition of papercutting (especially the part remaining in Southern China), and his skills had improved significantly at the same time.

In 1957, The First National Senior Artists Congress (Chinese: 首届全国老艺人代表大会) was held in Beijing and Wang Zigan was elected a representative. In the congress, Zhu De (Chinese: 朱德) and other State leaders delivered speeches and came over to see the representatives from all over the country.

In 1960, the first Wang Zigan's papercut collection was published by Light Industry Publishing House (Chinese: 轻工业出版社). The arts and crafts circle established a system of professional titles, according the title Wang Zigan was awarded in  Arts and Crafts Master (Chinese: 工艺师).

Cultural Revolution
The "Four Cleanups Movement" (Chinese: 四清运动) broke out nationwide among the slogans of "Never forget class struggles", and everyone was to be put in a certain class. Wang Zigan was sure of himself to be classified in the working class, but somehow it was believed that he had been an exploiter in the old society, therefore was in the exploiting class. It was not until the close of the Cultural Revolution that the organization reviewed Wang Zigan's status after repeated petitions raised by him.

During the Cultural Revolution he turned to be the target of revolution. Dazibao (Chinese: 大字报), posters written in big characters, and mass criticism and repudiation turned the senior artists of his work unit into "bourgeois academic authorities", and by destroying the "four Olds" (Chinese: 破四旧), all the traditional artistic pieces were labeled with "feudalistic, bourgeois and revisionist" (Chinese: 封资修). The Arts and Crafts Studio, like other units of its kind throughout the country, was plunged into the hurly-burly of revolution. In the chaotic winter of 1966, Wang Zigan took his second son to Nanjing in order to "establishing revolutionary ties" (Chinese: 串联). He was dispatched to do chores in a canteen and drove a pedicab.

Wang Zigan returned to his work and rekindled enthusiasm in art soon after the Cultural Revolution had ended. He had been good at papercutting with South China features, and had long been pursuing the perfection in its style. In addition, his papercuts had been freed from the embroidery patterns and took the form of a decoration in a unique way. He was not yet satisfied with what he had achieved for they lacked a grand atmosphere but were simple in style and weak in decoration and lines. He perused the materials and pictures from the Han and Tang Dynasties, made a study in the paper-cut works of Northern China, drew inspiration from such other artistic fields as Peking operas, woodcut paintings (Chinese: 版画), Chinese brush paintings and Chinese calligraphy, and took good advice from other senior artists. As a result, his papercut underwent a significant change in style.

Later life and achievements
On 1 July 1983, the leaders of Shanghai Arts and Crafts Institution (previously known as Shanghai Arts and Crafts Studio) held a commemorate exhibition of Wang Zigan's 50-year papercutting career at Shanghai Fine Arts Museum (Chinese: 上海美术展览馆). Many celebrities of the art circle came to the show and jointly applauded his works.

Wang Zigan had been to Japan twice in the 1980s and once to Hong Kong to give lectures. In the meantime, he published a series of papercut collections. On the opening ceremony of the First Shanghai International Art Festival (Chinese: 第一届 上海国际电视艺术节), Wang Zigan appeared on a TV program and gave a papercut performance face to face with foreign and Chinese guests. Jiang Zemin (Chinese: 江泽民), then Shanghai mayor, sat beside him after the performance and chatted with him for half an hour about the past and present of papercutting. He praised his excellent skills and even mentioned the papercut artists in his hometown Yangzhou.

In September 1990 when the 11th Asiad was held in Beijing, Wang Zigan was a member of the Shanghai Delegation in the Shopping Centre of Beijing Asiad, and Zhu Rongji (Chinese: 朱镕基), then Shanghai mayor, came to see the Shanghai Delegation. When he saw the performance Wang Zigan had gven, Zhu Rongji exclaimed: Wonderful cut (Chinese: 神剪)!

The Arts and Crafts Institution had received millions of foreign guests following the open policy, and Wang Zigan won applause each time he gave a papercut performance. James Callaghan, former prime minister of the UK, and Yang Zhengning (Chinese: 杨振宁), a Nobel Prize winner, wrote letters after they returned home, speaking highly of his superior skills.

In 1957, his papercuts "Plum blossoms, orchids, bamboo, and chrysanthemum" (Chinese: 梅兰竹菊) and "Beijing Tian'anmen and Indonesia Treasure Palace"(Chinese: 北京天安门和印尼藏物宫) were given to foreign leaders as national gifts.

Wang Zigan had won the title of a Shanghai Model worker (Chinese: 劳动模范) for three consecutive years, was elected a member of Shanghai Municipal CPPCC (Chinese: 上海市政协), a member of the China Folk Literary and Arts Association (Chinese: 中国文学艺术家联合会民间研究会), council of China Folk Literature and Arts Studies (Chinese: 中国民间文艺研究会) and council of Shanghai Folk Literature and Arts Studies (Chinese: 上海市民间文艺研究会), joined China Fine Artists Association (Chinese: 中国美术家协会), and was awarded the title of a senior master in arts and crafts (Chinese: 高级工艺美术师) in 1987. He was granted the title of a Super Master in Arts and Crafts (Chinese: 工艺美术特级大师)  and the honor medal, and was engaged by the Shanghai Municipal Government to do research in the Research Institute of Culture and History.

In November 1993, Wang Zigan had a stroke due to infarction arteriosclerosis and was confined to bed for seven years. He died on 16 February 2000.

Features and style of Wang's papercuts
He inherited the folk papercutting tradition of the south of Yangtze River, and added his own innovation to his work on the basis of the original one. He expanded the subjects of papercut to a wider range, breaking through the limitation of the traditional papercut, which mostly featured on embroidery patterns. Traditional patterns, ranging from flowers, birds, fish and insects to mountains, rivers and fruits, and to people and beasts, as well as to fashionable ones that city people love are all used in the subjects of his works. He also made full use of waste material, cutting animals and plants out of modern waste paper. Such waste paper is of hard quality and the texture patterns which are produced during the process of printing, finely used by him, greatly enriched the papercut. Pursuit of learning while not being restricted to the tradition and the spirit of innovation made his papercut stand out. Containing not only simple and profound cultural foundation, but also fresh and lively modern elements, his papercuts reached the true realm of art.

His papercut idea is well designed and the characters are lively, being well expressed by him. The animals in his papercut have a kind of "spirituality": the naughty monkeys, the clever frogs, vigorous phoenix. His works combine with the delicacy of the South-style papercut and the outgoingness of the Northern-style papercut perfectly.

His papercutting has a strong rhythm and he was good at displaying the features of his papercut: symmetry, repetition and the interdependence of yin and yang. He was also good at displaying the animals' feathers and scales by repeatedly using his scissor and showing the actions and movements of animals by some spin patterns. This not only made cutting easier but also added more content to his works.

He had skilled papercutting skills, which contributed to his childhood experience of street performance. He used a large pair of scissors to perform in public, which are different from the papercutters from the South who carved patterns with knives. According to gjart, such performance provided people with great vision enjoyment.

Development and transmission

Wang Jianzhong
Wang Jianzhong (Chinese: 王建中) is the son of Wang Zigan, a senior engineer at Tongji University. He is one of the most greatest papercut artists in Shanghai. In only one minute, Wang can cut out any one of the 12 animals used in the Chinese counting cycle for the lunar calendar. He didn't take up the folk art until the age of 38, while his father Wang Zigan had started at the age of 13.

Wang initially took a completely different path than that of his father. After labouring in the countryside for several years after graduating from high school, he went to Tongji University, majoring in mechanical engineering. He has been teaching at Tongji University ever since he graduated, and he is now a senior engineer at the school. In 1993, Wang's father suffered a stroke and was confined to his bed. His health degenerated quickly after that. As the only son of the noted folk artist whose works have been collected by foreign dignitaries, Wang Jianzhong then shouldered the responsibility of carrying on his father's art, which is a precious part of China's cultural heritage.

Wang believes that he should not go public with his skills until he has mastered at least 90 per cent of his father's techniques. He also believes that artists should inject audacious innovation into their folk art. Being a scholar, Wang reads extensively. This has led him to sources of innovation. He has been developing the qiaose papercut technique (literally translated as clever cutting with coloured paper). For example, he used a photo depicting a red flower in a black vase to create a red rooster heralding the break of the day on a black hill. The idea is widely acclaimed by the young, who think it is really funny and requires both excellent skills and brilliant creativity.

His works of papercut won a Silver Award in Chinese Papercut Art Exhibition (Chinese: 华夏风韵剪纸艺术展), and a Gold Award in The First Chinese Folk Auspicious Art Exhibition in Nanjing.

In 2010 Wang's son brought Shanghai Zhending Chicken Development Industry Co to court for using his father's artwork on its registered trademark without approval. The local Chinese fast food restaurant was ordered to pay 80,000 yuan (US$12,640) to Wang's children for plagiarizing his rooster papercut design.

Zhao Ziping
Zhao Ziping (Chinese: 赵子平), a papercutter who lived in Zhabei district, Shanghai, was an apprentice to Wang Zigan. His works of papercutting are of wide subjects. The style of Zhao Ziping papercuts is distinctive with neat and exaggerate shapes. The lines of his papercuts are also natural and smooth. Zhao Ziping is good at creating two delicate, yin and yang works at the same time, which just use varieties of colours and grans of patterns. Meanwhile. He also tried to blaze a new trail of papercuts both in techniques and subjects. During productive time in his career, Zhao Ziping created tremendous papercuts with subjects of Chinese Ancient Fables, the Chinese horoscope and Dunhuang Murals etc.

References

Sources

"神剪" 王子淦的故事,王建中,上海档案 2003.No.3,Shanghai Archives

External links 
Transmitters of Shanghai-style papercutting
Intangible cultural heritage-Folk Fine Arts: Shanghai-style papercutting
Shanghai Museum of Arts and Crafts
传统工艺人才出现断层原因何在, 朱孝岳, 上海工艺美术, Shanghai Arts & Crafts, 2002年01期
《手工艺创意产业》，许思豪编著，2009，p47, 48, 49
 《民间文艺集刊 第三集》,中国民间文艺研究会上海分会,王子淦，第254页
《家庭巧作 （二）》,王子淦 裴晋昌 王大钧 陈长标等编写,第26页
王子淦剪纸选,王子淦作，上海人民美术出版社 1985

1920 births
2000 deaths
Artists from Nantong